Ministry of Social Affairs and Labour (Arabic: وزارة الشؤون الاجتماعية والعمل ) is a cabinet ministry of Yemen.

List of ministers 

 Mohamad Saeed Al-Zaouri (17 December 2020 – present)
 Ahmed Mohamed al-Shami (2014)
 Qabul al-Mutawkel (2014)

See also 

 Politics of Yemen

References 

 

Government ministries of Yemen